Die Suid-Afrikaan was a progressive Afrikaans-language monthly published in Cape Town.

Afrikaner culture in Cape Town
Defunct newspapers published in South Africa
Afrikaans-language newspapers
Mass media in Cape Town
Publications with year of establishment missing